Hatful of Rain, an acoustic music group from Brighton and Shoreham-by-Sea, Sussex, England, perform original material that combines English folk sounds with harmony singing and American bluegrass music. Critically acclaimed, the band came to the attention of broadcaster Mike Harding, who played their music on his BBC Radio 2 show. The band also performed live on BBC Radio 2's Bob Harris Sunday programme on 24 March 2013.

Origins
Mandolin player Fred Gregory (who is also with the group Porchlight Smoker), vocalist Chloe Overton and banjo/bass player Phil Jones first performed together at a 2010 South Coast folk festival, and were later joined by violinist James Shenton who has played with the London Symphony Orchestra and the Balanescu Quartet. The band's name comes from the lyric "Got a head full of lightning and a hatful of rain", in the Tom Waits song "Long Way Home".

Recording history
Their debut album, Way Up on the Hill, was released on 30 May 2012. Actress Amanda Abbington performed in the official video that accompanied the release of The Exit Song, a single from the album. The video was directed by Jamie Freeman (brother of actor Martin Freeman) and Stevie Freeman, who run the Union Music store in Lewes, East Sussex.

Their second album, The Morning Key, was released on 25 May 2014. The album's title comes from a song by Jones, "Broad Woolly Back", written about his emotional experiences following the death of his father. The album was produced by Al Scott, better known for his work with The Levellers. In a review for Folk Radio UK, Paul Woodgate said that the album "strikes for the heart and head and succeeds on both counts...If you like Rusby, the Wailin’ Jenny's and Cara Dillon, add this to your 'must listen' list". Iain Hazlewood, for Spiral Earth, said:
"The combination of mandolin, banjo, bass and fiddle is nigh on perfect, the songs have space to grow but they know exactly when to roll with it."

The band's first EP, Climb the Air, was released on 15 April 2016.

Discography

Personal lives
Chloe Overton, the band's singer and lyricist, works as a midwife. She has four children.  Fred Gregory, guitar and mandolin, works as a carpenter.  Phil Jones, bass and banjo, works as a workplace mediator.

Notes

References

External links
 Official website

2010 establishments in England
English bluegrass music groups
Musical groups established in 2010